Het Nieuwe Instituut (HNI, English: The New Institute) is a cultural centre in Rotterdam, the Netherlands. It focuses on architecture, design, and digital culture. HNI is in a building designed by Jo Coenen at Museumpark 25 in the centre of Rotterdam, adjacent to the Museum Boijmans Van Beuningen. The building contains a shop, exhibition space, study centre, and archive, as well as the Sonneveld House (a prime example of Nieuwe Zakelijkheid architecture), a pond, and a small park.

Formation 
Het Nieuwe Instituut (HNI) was formed in 2013, when then-secretary of state for Education, Culture, and Science Halbe Zijlstra ordered the merger of the Dutch institutes for architecture, design, and e-culture. Thus the Netherlands Architecture Institute, Premsela Dutch Platform for Design and Fashion, and the Virtueel Platform were put together in the building at Museum Park 25, which was designed by Jo Coenen, and opened by Queen Beatrix in 1993.

Facilities 
At HNI, exhibitions are presented in the Museum of Architecture, Design and Digital Culture. The building also contains the national collection for Dutch architecture and urban planning, an agency, a study centre, a bookshop and a cafe. The archive contains over 18 kilometres of architectural resources. This includes the personal collections of many Dutch architects.

Sonneveld House Museum 

The Sonneveld House, across the street from the HNI main building, was opened to the public in 2001. The house was designed by Johannes Brinkman and Leendert van der Vlugt (who also constructed the Van Nelle Factory), and it is an example of Nieuwe Zakelijkheid architecture. It was owned by Albertus Sonneveld, who lived there from 1933 to 1955.

References

External links 
 Official site

2013 establishments in the Netherlands
Architecture museums in the Netherlands
Archives in the Netherlands
Arts organizations established in 2013
Bookstores in the Netherlands
Buildings and structures in Rotterdam
Cultural centers
Museums in Rotterdam
Urban planning museums
21st-century architecture in the Netherlands